FemTechNet (FTN) is a feminist network of scholars, artists, and activists known for its feminist, decentralized pedagogy experiments. FemTechNet became the focus of various media outlets when it broadcast its efforts to "storm" Wikipedia under its "wikistorming" initiative. Beyond its 2013 Wikipedia project, FemTechNet has been described as "a new approach to collaborative learning", and a "feminist anti-MOOC."

Background

The network began in Southern California in 2012 with Anne Balsamo and Alexandra Juhasz as co-founders and co-facilitators. FemTechNet describes itself as “an activated network of scholars, artists and students who work on, with, and at the borders of technology, science and feminism in a variety of fields including STS, Media and Visual Studies, Art, Women's, Queer and Ethnic Studies.” In a peer-reviewed concept paper, the founders more concretely described the project as one of interdisciplinary community building.

Distributed open collaborative courses (DOCC), FemTechNets primary initiative, uses networked technologies in many innovative ways, including developing “nodal” classes around shared themes that are augmented by video discussions available on FemTechNet's website by participating university instructors. The first DOCC, "Dialogues in Feminism and Technology," was initiated in 2013 as for-credit courses at the following institutions: 
 Rutgers University 
 The New School
 CUNY 
 University of California at San Diego 
 University of Illinois 
 Ohio State University
 Bowling Green State University 
 Pitzer College 
 Colby-Sawyer College 
 Penn State University 
 California Polytechnic University 
 Ontario College of Art and Design 
 Brown University
 Yale University
California State University, Fullerton 

Non-traditional students take the course via the FTN website's free, self-directed learner component. In 2014 - 2015 the second Distributed Open Collaborative Course (DOCC) series was offered at the following nodes.

In 2013 FemTechNet launched "Storming Wikipedia", which aimed to encourage students to engage in Wikipedia editing. Described as a response to Wikipedia's gender imbalance, the assignment is also used to highlight "the significant contributions of feminists to technology". "Wikistorming" got the attention of mainstream media networks, including a story by Fox News and CampusReform.org, which derisively framed the effort as counter-factual.

See also
 Cyberfeminism
 Feminist technoscience
 Networked feminism

References

External links
FemTechNet (Old Site)
FemTechNet (New site)
"We Are FemTechNet" (Group Manifesto)
Technical Report on the DOCC
FAQ for FemTechNet
Connected Courses, Unit 4, Class 3: Teaching Wikipedia Editing

Feminist websites
American educational websites
Wikipedia